Punan language can refer to several Austronesian languages of Borneo:

Punan languages, closely related languages spoken by the Punan people
Penan-Nibong language, a language complex spoken by the Penan people
Punan Kelai language, part of the Segai–Modang subgroup of Kayanic
Melanau–Kajang languages, also referred to as Müller-Schwaner 'Punan'
Siang language, a Barito language spoken in upstream Barito River, whose speakers are sometimes referred to as 'Punan' by people downstream